Agia Kyriaki (Agía Kyriakí; before 1955: Kertiza (Greek: Κέρτιζα, Kértiza)) is a mountain village in the municipal unit of Lasiona, Elis, Greece. It is situated in the southwestern foothills of Mount Erymanthos at 940 metres elevation, 4 km west of Lampeia, 7 km northeast of Antroni and 26 km northeast of Olympia.

Population

See also

List of settlements in Elis

References

External links

 Agia Kyriaki GTP Travel Pages

Populated places in Elis